

The Pilatus P-4 was a Swiss five-seat cabin monoplane designed and built by Pilatus, but had little sales success.

Design and development
The P-4 was not designed specifically as a passenger aircraft but rather as a versatile working aircraft. The aim was to build a robust aircraft with good slow-flying handling, requiring only short takeoff and landing runs and little maintenance. 

The P-4 was a high-wing monoplane with a fixed tailwheel undercarriage. The aircraft's fuselage was of fabric-covered steel-tube construction, with the wing, which was braced to the fuselage by steel V-struts was of wooden construction. It was powered by a  Lycoming GO-435 engine (later replaced by a  GO-435-C2a) driving a two-bladed variable-pitch propeller. Its enclosed cabin could accommodate a pilot a pilot and four passengers, with the provision for carrying two stretchers, photographic equipment or crop spraying equipment. Alternative ski or float undercarriages could be fitted.

The prototype P-4, aircraft registration HB-AET took off for its maiden flight on 22 March 1948. Although the aircraft was exhibited at the 1949 Paris Air Show, it did not enter production owing to a lack of production capacity, Pilatus being busy refurbishing the Swiss Air Force's P-51 Mustang fighters and later, license-building de Havilland Venom jet fighters.

On 13 October 1957, the P-4 crashed in the Susten Pass region while on an exercise with the Swiss Air Rescue Service and was completely written off. Pilatus Aircraft Ltd. had always owned the P-4 until that time.

Specifications (P-4)

References
Notes

Sources

External links

 Pilatus P-4

P-04
1940s Swiss civil utility aircraft
Single-engined tractor aircraft
High-wing aircraft
Aircraft first flown in 1948